Ian Brian Johnston (born June 1952) was the Independent Gwent Police and Crime Commissioner. He was the first person to hold the post and was elected on 15 November 2012. He did not seek re-election in 2016.

Background
He describes himself as having been "born and bred in the County of Gwent", and served as a police officer from 1971 until 2004. He worked in Newport, Blackwood, Pontypool, Caerphilly and Ebbw Vale as a uniformed officer and detective, and then at Pontypool for six years as a Detective Chief Inspector and Chief Superintendent.  He was head of CID in Gwent Police from 1994 until 1999, and was awarded the Queen's Police Medal for distinguished service in 2003.

After his retirement from the police service he served as President of the Police Superintendents' Association of England and Wales from 2007 to 2010.  His platform at the PCC election in 2012 was to "Keep Politics out of Policing".

Ian died on 15 February 2023 at the Heath Hospital, Cardiff after a fall earlier that week

Controversy over resignation of Chief Constable
In June 2013 Johnston was criticised by local MPs Wayne David and Paul Flynn for his actions in causing the resignation of the Chief Constable of Gwent Police, Carmel Napier.  Johnston criticised Napier's management style, saying that their relationship "was never going to work," and confirmed that he had told her to either retire or "be removed." Johnston and Napier both later gave evidence to the Home Affairs Select Committee, which discussed the circumstances of her retirement. The Select Committee report criticised Johnston's "disdainful attitude towards scrutiny by Parliament, as well as an indication of a clear over-sensitivity to criticism".  It said that Johnston had been elected by less than 8% of the local electorate, and "had managed to side-step the statutory arrangements for local scrutiny of his decision to sack the chief constable".

References

Police and crime commissioners in Wales
Living people
1952 births
Welsh recipients of the Queen's Police Medal
Independent police and crime commissioners